Gulickia alexandri is a species of air-breathing land snail, a terrestrial pulmonate gastropod mollusk in the family Achatinellidae. This species is endemic to Hawaii, the United States.

References

Achatinellidae
Molluscs of Hawaii
Endemic fauna of Hawaii
Critically endangered fauna of Hawaii
Taxonomy articles created by Polbot